Senec is a town in the Bratislava Region of south-western Slovakia. The town is the administrative seat of the Senec District and its largest municipality. In 2022 it had a population of over 20,000.

The town is a summer tourism and recreation center well known for its summer resort Sunny Lakes and its proximity to Bratislava, the capital and largest city of Slovakia.

Etymology 
The town's contemporary name comes from a Slavic appellative seno, meaning hay, as the inhabitants dealt with cattle trade (see also Senica, Senné, Veľký Krtíš District or Senné, Michalovce District). Throughout its history the town name's form changed multiple times, in 1252 being written as Zemch, in 1451 as Sencz.

In German, the name Wartberg was historically used. The name is supposedly derived from a fortified hill upon which the Church of Saint Nicholaus stands to this day.

History 
In the 9th century, the territory of Senec became part of the Great Moravia.
In the second half of the 15th century, Hungarian king Matthias Corvinus gave Senec privileges and it got the right of organizing a fair around 1480. In the 19th century, it started to develop after the Pressburg - Budapest railway which runs through the town had been built. After the Austro-Hungarian army disintegrated in November 1918, Czechoslovak troops occupied the area, later acknowledged internationally by the Treaty of Trianon. Between 1938 and 1945 Senec once more became part of Miklós Horthy's Hungary through the First Vienna Award. In 1945, it was recovered by Czechoslovakia. A number of residents were affected by the Beneš Decrees and 630 citizens who collaborated with Miklós Horthy's forces during occupation of Senec were forced to leave the town in 1947 to Hungary. This was a part of Czechoslovak-Hungarian post-war treaty regarding exchange of citizens signed by both, Hungary and Czechoslovakia. From 1945 until the Velvet Divorce, it was part of Czechoslovakia. Since then it has been part of Slovakia.

The historic Church of Saint Nicholaus is located in the southwestern part of the town.

Geography 

Senec is situated in Podunajská nížina, on the boundary line of Podunajská rovina and Podunajská pahorkatina. The town is 27 km far from the Austrian boundary (frontier crossing at Kittsee), and 28 km far from the border with Hungary (frontier crossing at Rajka). Vienna (90 km), Budapest (230 km) and Prague (350 km) are the nearest European capitals.

The town is located 25 kilometres north-east from Bratislava, 126 m above sea level. It has good access to the motorway D1 from Bratislava to Žilina, and is situated on the significant 4th Corridor of Trans-European Transport Network Railway route Prague–Bratislava–Balkans/Orient.

The town consists of four boroughs (Senec, Svätý Martin, Červený majer and Horný dvor).

Demographics 
In 2001 14,673 permanent residents lived in Senec and the population density was 379/km². Accordingly, Senec ranks at the 55th place among 138 Slovak cities and towns. Following the age, 67.5% inhabitants are in the productive age (men 15–59 years old, women 15–54 years old).

77% occupants acknowledged Slovak nationality and 22% Hungarian nationality. The Roman Catholic Church dominates with 71.7% within the religious structure. The Protestant Church with 8.45% is the second largest Church. The residents without faith represent 12.89%.

In education, technical and secondary schools without the General Certificate of Education dominate with 27.91%. In 2001 graduates represented 11.17% share of Senec residents.

Twin towns — sister cities

Senec is twinned with:
 Mosonmagyaróvár, Hungary
 Kőszeg, Hungary
 Parndorf, Austria
 Senj, Croatia
 Ialoveni, Moldova

Asteroid 
Asteroid 20664 Senec was named in honor of the Slovak town. The official naming citation was published by the Minor Planet Center on 25 September 2018.

See also 
 FC Senec

References

External links 
 City official municipal website
 Map of Senec

Cities and towns in Slovakia